Nymphispira is a genus of sea snails, marine gastropod mollusks in the family Pseudomelatomidae.

Species
 Nymphispira nymphia (Pilsbry & H. N. Lowe, 1932) : synonym of Pilsbryspira nymphia (Pilsbry & H. N. Lowe, 1932)

References

External links
 McLean, J.H. (1971) A revised classification of the family Turridae, with the proposal of new subfamilies, genera, and subgenera from the Eastern Pacific. The Veliger, 14, 114–130
 
  Bouchet, P.; Kantor, Y. I.; Sysoev, A.; Puillandre, N. (2011). A new operational classification of the Conoidea (Gastropoda). Journal of Molluscan Studies. 77(3): 273-308

Pseudomelatomidae
Gastropod genera